Among Bahraini football clubs the one that has won by far the greatest number of trophies is Al-Muharraq Sports Club, which has won both the Bahraini Premier League and the King's Cup on 30 or more occasions.

Successful teams 

 
Football in Bahrain